Aama Samuha is a Nepalese voluntary group formed to raise awareness about gender equality, issues affecting women and social issues. It was started in Western Nepal by the Gurung people because Gurung men would leave Nepal to join the British Army (Brigade of Gurkhas), and lately the Indian Army (Gorkha regiments). Aama Samuha was originally started to "sing, dance and organise cultural activities in the evening".

References 

Nepalese culture
Non-profit organisations based in Nepal
Educational organisations based in Nepal
Women's organisations based in Nepal
Women's rights in Nepal